The East Germany national football team represented the former state of East Germany from 1952 until the German reunification in 1990. The team was governed by the Deutscher Fußball-Verband, and was a part of the UEFA confederation.

East Germany's first international fixture was in 1952 against Poland, ending in a 3–0 loss. The team entered every World Cup and European Championship between 1958 and 1990, but only qualified for the final tournament on one occasion, the 1974 World Cup. The team's final fixture was a 2–0 victory against Belgium in 1990, which was initially scheduled to be a qualifying match for the 1992 European Championship before the reunification was announced.

Results
The following is a list of all fixtures played by East Germany.

1952 – 1960 – 1970 – 1980 – 1990

Record by opponent
The GDR played a total of 293 matches between 1952 and 1990, facing 52 different countries. The team which the GDR faced on the most occasions was Poland, the two sides playing each other 19 times.

See also 
 Germany national football team records
 Germany national football team results (1908–42)
 Germany national football team results (1990–99)
 Germany national football team results (2000–19)
 Germany national football team results (2020–present)
 West Germany national football team results (1950–90)

References
General
East Germany - International Results 1952-1990 RSSSF
East Germany - International Results RSSSF
FIFA Statistics: Head-To-Head FIFA.com
DDR aktuell - Nationalmannschaft T-Online Sport 
Specific

East Germany
East Germany national football team